Vakula Devi is the foster mother of Lord Venkateswara. Vakula Matha Temple is situated in Peruru(patakaluva) located in Tirupati city, Andhra Pradesh. As per the legend of Tirumala, it dates back to Dvapara Yuga when Yasoda, the foster mother of Lord Krishna (avatar of  Lord Vishnu) complains to him that she could not witness any of his marriages. To this, Lord Krishna replies he would ensure she would get such opportunity later in Kali Yuga.

In Kali Yuga, Lord Vishnu adorns the world as Lord Venkateswara and Yasoda is reborn as Vakula Devi, foster mother of Lord Venkateswara, to arrange his wedding with Padmavati the daughter of King Akasa Raja. Thus Vakula Devi  fulfills her wish to witness the kalyanam (wedding) of Lord Venkateswara.

Emergence of Temple 

Since Vakula Devi, as a loving influence in the life of Lord Venkateswara best exemplifies the mother-son relationship, a Temple in her name was built about 300 years ago on Perurubanda hillock, around the scenic Perur village. More than 50 acres of land is devoted to the temple, located within 10 kilometers of Tirumala hills. As per the wishes of Vakula maata (mother), this temple was constructed in such a way that visage of maata faces the Seven Hills, where her son Lord Venkateswara resides.

The love and affection between mother-son is so evident that naivedyam ('bhogh' in Hindi) is first offered to mother and only later, to Lord Venkateswara at Tirumala. The Priests ring the large bells at Vakula maata temple to indicate naivedyam offered to the mother, and later the priests at Tirumala submit offerings to Lord Venkateswara. Such was the tradition followed in earlier days until the temple was destroyed, and lost its glory.

Destruction and negligence 

Post Independence, the temple has been the object of neglect by the Tirumala Tirupati Devasthanams (TTD), its lackadaisical attitude best reflected in its E.O.'s statement, "The basic reason for exclusion of the temple by TTD lies in G.O. (Government order) of 1987 which has not listed Vakula maata temple among those that TTD shall look after". It is a subject of concern for many that TTD ignores the mother of Lord Venkateswara while it spends millions over renovation of temples located elsewhere. As a result, the Vakula maata temple remains in dilapidated condition and in dire need of renovation.

Illegal mining 

Activists and local people of Tirupati claim it is politics, corruption, careless attitude of those in power resulted in poor maintenance of the temple. The hillock on which the temple is situated known for best rock quality, being mined illegally to be used in construction industry. These illegal miners are closely related to politicians of the district, hence the Administration and Police seem helpless.

In the meanwhile, illegal quarrying started slowly stripping away the hill from all sides. It appears that as much as 80 percent of the hill was flattened. It is possible that the Temple may even collapse since the foundation has become weak.

Members of the archaeology group too have expressed concern over this poor attitude towards preserving the centuries-old temple. "No official is bothered to preserve this ancient heritage structure. We cannot allow the temple to fall in the hands of land sharks," an archaeologist associated with Tirumala temple affairs said.

Public outrage and protests 

A number of organizations, Hindu religious heads and leaders of various political parties expressed anguish over the pathetic condition of the temple, and have approached TTD over the years to restore the Vakula maata Temple.

Many Hindu saints and seers have also made representations to the government regarding the need to renovate the temple and ban the illegal mining in the area. Swami Paripoornananda Saraswati of Sreepeetham, as well as activists from the Global Hindu Heritage Foundation performed a Padayatra to Perurbanda hillock and protested against the inaction of TTD and the government of the day.
Swami Paripoornananda Saraswati threatened to stay on Deeksha (fasting) at the site if TTD did not respond in time.

The Bharatiya Janata Party has protested several times in the past and submitted a memorandum to TTD Chairman and Governor of the state for the cause of renovation of the temple. The party even issued a legal notice requesting the Courts to intervene, and direct TTD for renovation of the temple.

In response to the demands of various organizations, TTD responded with a plan to renovate Vakula maata Temple with an outlay of Rs. 2 crore including Rs. 15 lakh to be spent on fencing the premises on the hillock. However, local mining companies approached the Courts and got a stay order in 2010 preventing TTD from taking up renovation of the Temple.

However, subsequently in the year 2012, High Court of Judicature at Hyderabad vacated the stay and ordered the TTD to renovate and restore the temple back to its pristine glory. TTD assured the Court it would comply with the order, but so far not a brick has been laid at the temple site, thereby allowing illegal mining to thrive.

It is now hoped that the matter will be escalated so that the State and Central governments would take necessary action to suspend illegal mining in the area and exhort TTD board to renovate the Temple.

References

External links 
 Tirumala
 Global Hindu Heritage Foundation
 Tirumala Tirupati

Hindu goddesses
Tirupati
Buildings and structures in Tirupati
Hindu temples in Tirupati district
Tirumala Tirupati Devasthanams